The Danish men's national under 20 ice hockey team is the national under-20 ice hockey team in Denmark. The team represents Denmark at the International Ice Hockey Federation's World U20 Championships. Denmark has played in the top division in 2008, 2012 and 2015-2019. They've reached the quarterfinals three times, their best finish being 5th in 2017.

During the 2015 World Juniors the Danes won their first ever game in the Top Division with a 4-3 shootout win over Switzerland. This win allowed Denmark to finish 4th in Group B and, for the first time, advance to quarter finals, which guaranteed them their highest finish ever in the tournament and avoided relegation for the first time. After a quarter final loss to Canada, the Dane's finished 8th place. They competed in Group A in the Top Division at the 2016 World Junior Ice Hockey Championships in Helsinki, Finland, and finished in 8th place again, after a quarter final loss to Russia.

History

Junior
Junior national ice hockey teams